Jabalpur is a city situated on the banks of Narmada River in the state of Madhya Pradesh, India. According to the 2011 census, it is the third-largest urban agglomeration in Madhya Pradesh and the country's 38th-largest urban agglomeration. Jabalpur is an important administrative, industrial and business center of Madhya Pradesh. It is the judicial capital of Madhya Pradesh as The Madhya Pradesh High Court along with other important administrative headquarters of India and Madhya Pradesh are located in Jabalpur. It is generally accepted that the game of Snooker originated in Jabalpur. Jabalpur is the administrative headquarters of Jabalpur district (the second-most-populous district in Madhya Pradesh) and the Jabalpur division. It also is a major education centre in India. The city is known for the marble rocks on the river Narmada at Bhedaghat.

Etymology 
According to a prevalent theory, Jabalpur was named after a sage named Jabali, who meditated on the banks of the Narmada river. Another theory suggests an Arabic origin of the word since jabal in Arabic means granite boulders or huge boulders, which were common in the region.

In 2006, the Jabalpur Municipal Corporation renamed the city to Jabalpur.

History 
Mythology describes three Asuras (evil spirits) in the Jabalpur region, who were defeated by the Hindu god Shiva. Tripurasura being the main asura, gave the city its puranic name Tripur Tirth. Tripuri region corresponds to the ancient Chedi Kingdom of Mahabharata times, to which king Shishupala belongs.

When the empire fell, Jabalpur became a city-state before coming under the rule of the Satavahana dynasty (230 BCE to 220 CE). After their reign, the region was ruled locally by the Bodhis and the Senas, following which it became a vassal state of the Gupta Empire (320 to 550).

From 675 to 800, the region was ruled by Bamraj Dev of the Kalachuri Dynasty from Karanbel. The best known Kalachuri ruler was Yuvraj Dev I ( 915–945), who married Nohla Devi (a princess of the Chalukya dynasty).

One of the Kalachuri ministers, Golok Simha Kayastha, was instrumental in founding the Chausath Yogini Temple near Bhedaghat. His descendants include Bhoj Simha, who was the Dewan to Sangramsahi (r. 1491–1543); Dewan Adhar Simha, who was the prime minister to Rani Durgavati (r. 1550–1564), and Beohar Raghuvir Sinha, the last Jagirdar of Jabalpur who reigned until 1947.

Gondwana rule 

The Gondwana king, Raje Madan Shah Madawi of Mandla, (r. 1138–1157) built a watchtower and a small hilltop fort at Madan Mahal, an area in Jabalpur. In the 1500s, the Gond king, Sangram (whose son, Raje Dalpat Shah Madawi married Rani Durgavati) held Singaurgarh fort in Sangrampur. Rani Durgawati was a warrior of the Chandel Rajput Dynasty, married to the Gond Dynasty, known for her prosperous kingdom. She was well aware of the importance of water conservation and hence she built more than 85 ponds in Jabalpur, mainly Ranital, Haathital, Madhatal and Hanumantal.

In 1564, during the reign of Veer Narayan (Sangram's grandson), Abdul Majeed Harawi (viceroy of Kara-Manikpur in the Mughal Empire) conquered Jabalpur and its surrounding areas. However, the Mughal supremacy in Jabalpur was more nominal than real.

In 1698, the Gondwana king, Raje Hriday Shah (r. 1652–1704) moved his court to the Mandla fort. He secured water sources and built irrigation structures. Later, Gondwana was seized by Nizam (r. 1753–1780). After Nizam, the Gondwana Kingdom was conquered by the Marathas.

Maratha rule 
The Maratha rulers of Sagar, came to power in about 1781. Around 1798, the Maratha Peshwa gave the Nerbuddah valley to the Bhonsle kings of Nagpur, who ruled the area until 1818, when it was seized by the British East India Company after the Battle of Sitabuldi.

British rule 

Under British rule, and among others in the works of Kipling, the city name was spelled Jubbulpore.

Climate 

Jabalpur has a humid subtropical climate typical of north-central India (Madhya Pradesh and southern Uttar Pradesh). Summer begins in late March, lasting until June. May is the hottest month, with an average temperature exceeding . Summer is followed by the southwest monsoon, which lasts until early October and produces  of rain from July to September. Winter begins in late November and lasts until early March. January is the coldest month, with an average daily temperature near .

Demographics 

In the 2011 India census, the Jabalpur city (the area covered by the municipal corporation) recorded a population of 1,081,677. The Jabalpur metropolitan area (urban agglomeration) recorded a population of 1,268,848.

Economy 

The Narmada river bringing in freshwater from the Vindyachal Ranges has developed Jabalpur district into an agrarian economy. The land of the Narmada basin with its fertile alluvial soil gives good yields of sorghum, wheat, rice, and millet in the villages around Jabalpur.
Important among commercial crops are pulses, oilseeds, cotton, sugar cane, and medicinal crops. The state is poised for a breakthrough in soybean cultivation. In Kharif crops occupy 60% and Rabi crops 40% area with 71.4% area under food grain production. Nearly 59% of landholders are marginal whereas small farmed share 18% of farmland.

Jabalpur has a variety of industries largely based in mineral substances of economic value found in the district, although the ready-made garments industry is a substantial portion of production in Jabalpur.

Defence establishments started in the early 20th century. Jabalpur has Vehicle Factory Jabalpur, Grey Iron Foundry, Gun Carriage Factory Jabalpur and Ordnance Factory Khamaria which belong to the Ordnance Factories Board manufacturing various products for the Indian Armed Forces. The Gun Carriage Factory was started in the year 1904 is well equipped and manufacture gun parts, mounting, shells, and a variety of the other product for war purposes. Vehicle Factory Jabalpur (VFJ) was started as a manufacturer of trucks and other defence vehicles. The other two are Grey Iron Foundry (GIF) and Ordnance Factory Khamaria (OFK).

Armed forces make up a large portion of the city and economy in this city. The city has three regimental centres: Grenadiers, Jammu and Kashmir rifles and the Signals regiment. Jabalpur is also the army headquarters of Madhya Pradesh, Bihar, Chhattisgarh, and Orissa.
Jabalpur is an important divisional headquarters, having eight districts: Jabalpur, Seoni, Mandla, Chhindwara, Narsimhapur, Katni, Dindori, Balaghat. The Jabalpur District has been reconstituted on 25 May 1998. It now has four tehsils Jabalpur, Sihora, Patan, and Kundam. Jabalpur also has the headquarters of the Madhya Pradesh State Electricity Board, Homeguards, and many other state and central government offices. There are seven blocks in the district with 1449 inhabited villages, 60 uninhabited, 1209 revenue villages, and 4 forest villages. The presence of several industries in Jabalpur bolstered the industrial scenario of the city. However, the industrial growth of the area owes much to the defense establishments and the four ordnance factories.

The presence of the military base and the ordnance factories have improved the infrastructure of the city. This has boosted the industrial development of Jabalpur.
The important industries in Jabalpur are:

Readymade garments units
Poultry/hatchery
Electrical goods industry
Sawmills
Wood cutting industry
Industries relating to limestone products
Building materials
Glassware
Telephone parts
Furniture making industry
Shaw Wallace Gelatin Factory
Steel structures works
Cement industries
Commercial Engineers & Body Builders Co Limited [CEBBCO ]
Tobacco business
Retail business
Food processing industry
Vendors for Coca-Cola India & Parle

The nominal GDP of Jabalpur District was estimated at Rs. 42,518 crores for the year 2020–21.

Information technology and park 
M.P. State Electronics Development Corporation Ltd. has set up an I.T. park (Techno Park) in Bargi Hills having total area of 60 acres, 22 km from the Jabalpur airport. Paytm started their operations at Jabalpur in 2018.

Government and public services

Civic administration 
The Jabalpur Municipal Corporation (JMC), is charged with governance of the city's civic and infrastructural assets. The corporation has two wings: deliberative and executive. The head of the executive wing is a municipal commissioner who is responsible for the corporation's day-to-day operation and assists the deliberative wing in the decision-making process. The JMC council has one elected representative (corporate) from each ward. Council elections, by popular vote, are held every five years. A corporate from the majority party is selected as mayor.

Jabalpur contributes one member to the Lok Sabha. Rakesh Singh of Bharatiya Janata Party had been elected as the Member of Parliament in the 2019 Lok Sabha election. The city sends eight members to the State Legislative Assembly: four from the city (Jabalpur Purba, Jabalpur Uttar, Jabalpur Cantonment and Jabalpur Paschim) and four from rural areas of the district. Jabalpur is divided into eight zones, each consisting of several wards.

Division headquarters 
Jabalpur is the divisional headquarters for eight districts: Jabalpur, Seoni, Mandla, Chhindwara, Narsinghpur, Katni, Dindori and Balaghat. The district, which was reconstituted on 25 May 1998, has seven tehsils:  Jabalpur, Sihora, Patan, Majhouli, Shahpura, Panagar and Kundam. The city is the headquarters of the Madhya Pradesh State Electricity Board, the Home-guards and other state and central-government offices.

Military establishments 
The Jabalpur Cantonment is one of the largest cantonments in India. In addition to the ordnance factories, other organisations present in the city include HQ Madhya Bharat Area, the Jammu & Kashmir Rifles Regimental Centre, the Grenadiers Regimental Centre, 1 Signal Training Centre, College of Material Management, Central Ordnance Depot, 506 Army Base Workshop, Military Hospital, HQ Chief Engineer Jabalpur Zone, Military Dairy Farm, and HQ Recruiting Zone. Civilian organisations which are part of the Ministry of Defence are the Cantonment Board, Controller of Defence Accounts, Defence Standardisation Cell and the Canteen Stores Department.

Culture

Cuisine 
Sweets in Jabalpur's local delicacy include Doodh ka Halwa, Kalakand, Bhaji Wada, Dal Mangode, Aloo Bonda, Khoye ki Jalebi, Mawa-Bati, Khoprapak, Shrikhand, Malpua, Imarti and Makkhanvada. Khoye ki Jalebi, which is quite popular in Madhya Pradesh, was invented by Harprasad Badkul in 1889 at his shop, Badkul Halwai.

Tourism 

Jabalpur is an important tourism city in Madhya Pradesh and central India. Notable sites in Jabalpur include Hanumantal Bada Jain Mandir, Jabalpur Madan Mahal, Dhuandhar Falls, Chausta-Yogini, Gwarighat  and Marble Rocks in Bhedaghat, Balancing rock near Madan Mahal Fort and the Shiv Statue at Kachnar City. The world-renowned tiger reserves like Kanha National Park, Bandhavgarh National Park, and Pench National Park can be easily visited via Jabalpur.

Hanumantal Bada Jain Mandir is a 17th-century Jain temple that appears like a fortress with numerous shikharas. The temple has 22 shrines (vedis), making it the largest independent Jain temple in India. Madan Mahal is a fort built by the Gondi king Madansahi in 1116 which is situated atop a hill in Jabalpur. Kachnar city in Jabalpur is known for a  Shiva statue housing a cavern with replicas of Shiva lingas from 12 shrines nationwide. The city also houses the Rani Durgawati Museum which was built in 1964 to commemorate Rani Durgavati. The museum hosts ancient relics, sculptures and a collection of items related to Mahatma Gandhi. Dumna Nature Reserve Park is an ecotourism site open to the public which is located in the Jabalpur district. It houses the Khandari Dam, which is a source of drinking water to the city and has many crocodiles. The Bargi Dam Reservoir near Jabalpur is known for boat rides.

The journey through Narmada reveals the Marble Rocks, where the river has carved the soft marble, creating a gorge of about 8 km in length, and the Dhuandhar falls, which is one of the most visited tourist destinations in Jabalpur. Lamheta Ghaat and Tilwara Ghaat are well-knownGhats on the banks of Narmada River. The Tilwadeshwar temple is located near the Tilwara Ghat and it is also the place where Gandhi's ashes were immersed.

Other tourist destinations near the city include Chausath Yogini Temple, Bhedaghat Fall, Bhadbhada fall, Gughra Fall, Osho Amritdham, Pisanhari Ki Madiya which is a historic Jain pilgrimage near Netaji Subhash Chandra Bose Medical College, and Nandishwardeep Jain temple.

Transport

Air 
The nearest airport is Jabalpur.

Rail  

Jabalpur Junction railway station, headquarters of the West Central Railway, is located within the city.

Jabalpur city has the divisional headquarters of the railways besides having the zonal headquarter of the West Central Railway (WCR). The boundaries of divisional headquarters extend up to Itarsi Junction station in the south, Bina Junction station in the north, Manikpur Junction station and Riwa station in the North East and Singaroli station in the east. All these railway lines are broad gauge lines. A narrow-gauge line existed between Jabalpur to Gondia station which has presently been converted to broad gauge. Now this line provides direct connectivity to Nagpur Junction railway station and Raipur Junction railway station, via Gondia Junction. The zonal headquarters include three divisions namely Jabalpur division, Bhopal Division and Kota division.

Road  
Jabalpur is connected by road to Varanasi, Damoh, Sagar,  Nagpur, Bhopal, Jaipur, Kota, Raipur, Prayagraj, Bilaspur and Bengaluru. National Highway 30 connects it to Prayagraj, Lucknow. National Highway 34 connects it to Kanpur.

Education 

Jabalpur became a centre of higher education by the end of the 19th century, with institutions such as the Hitkarini Sabha, established by local citizens in 1868, and Robertson College (now bifurcated into the Government Science College, Jabalpur, and Mahakoshal Arts & Commerce College) was established in Sagar in 1836 and moved to Jabalpur in 1873. Government Engineering College, Jabalpur was the first technical institution in Central India to be established by the British. IIITDM Jabalpur was founded in 2005. Scholars, authors and politicians such as Ravishankar Shukla, Rajneesh, Maharishi Mahesh Yogi and Gajanan Madhav Muktibodh had been in Jabalpur for some time in their life.

Jabalpur is known for many universities such as Rani Durgavati University (also called the University of Jabalpur), Madhya Pradesh Medical Science University, Jawaharlal Nehru Agricultural University, Nanaji Deshmukh Veterinary Science University and Dharmashastra National Law University, Jabalpur, Indian Council of Medical Research-NIRTH.

Jabalpur also hosts a Government Medical College named Netaji Subhash Chandra Bose Medical College.

Media 
Several television news channels have branches in the city. Various cable operators operate digital cable TV system in city.

Newspapers 
National and local newspapers are published in Jabalpur in Hindi and English:

Radio 
Radio stations in Jabalpur include:

Akashvani Jabalpur broadcasts on 801 kHz AM with a 200 kW transmitter.

Sports 
The city has two stadiums: Ravishankar Shukla Stadium and Rani Tal Stadium. It is generally accepted that while serving at Jabalpur in 1875, Colonel Sir Neville Chamberlain developed a new variation of black pool by introducing coloured balls into the game in the British Army officer's mess. This game was later dubbed snooker.

Notable people and residents 

Historical personalities
 Amedee Delalex (1826-1889)
 Rani Durgavati (1524–1564)
 Abani Mukherji (1891–1937)
Movie and TV personalities
 Tom Alter
 Jaya Bachchan
 Jennifer Mistry Bansiwal
 Shaleen Bhanot
 Gurmeet Choudhary 
 Kirron Kher
 Prem Nath
 Arjun Rampal
 Shalini Pandey
 Ashutosh Rana
 Pradeep Rawat
 Sharat Saxena
 Aadesh Shrivastava
 Raghubir Yadav
Armed forces officers
 Maj Gen G. D. Bakshi
 Admiral Jal Cursetji
 Lt Gen WAG Pinto
Civil servants and people holding high public office
 C. B. Bhave, IAS
 Sudhir Kumar Mishra
 S Prakash Tiwari
Politicians
 Captain B P Tiwari
 Frank Anthony
 Rameshwar Neekhra
 Rakesh Singh
 K. S. Sudarshan
 Vivek Tankha
 Shreegopal Vyas
 Sharad Yadav
Business
 Siddhartha Paul Tiwari
 Ajai Chowdhry
 Shyam Mardikar
Spiritual gurus
 Mahant Swami Maharaj
 Osho Rajneesh
 Maharshi Mahesh Yogi
 Mufti Abdul Rasheed Jabalpuri
Journalists
 Arnab Goswami
Engineers
 Dishank Agrawal, lending data analyst, Citigroup
 S. P. Chakravarti
Doctors
Yogesh Kumar Chawla
Pradeep Chowbey
Narmada Prasad Gupta
Pukhraj Bafna 
Shashi Wadhwa
Authors and poets
 Subhadra Kumari Chauhan
 Kamta Prasad Guru
 Harishankar Parsai
 Nell St. John Montague
 Ram Kinkar Upadhyay
Sportspersons

Madhu Yadav

See also 
 Jubbulpuria
 Jabalpur district
 Indian Ordnance Factories
 Tropical Forest Research Institute

References

External links 

 

 
Metropolitan cities in India
Articles containing potentially dated statements from 2011
All articles containing potentially dated statements
Cities in Madhya Pradesh